The Forbo Siegling Group's headquarters are located in Hanover, Germany. The company is an international manufacturer of conveyor and power transmission belts (flat belts) made of synthetic materials. The group has eight production facilities in Europe, Asia and America, as well as warehouses and workshops in over 50 countries. There are Forbo Siegling service points in more than 300 places all over the world.

History  

In 1919 Ernst Siegling founded a drive belt factory under his own name. Soon afterwards he started producing traditional, leather flat belts. Early in the 1920s chrome leather upright belts were being made and consisted of many riveted leather belts placed upright.

At the beginning of the 1940s, a patent was registered under the Extremultus brand for a multi-layer flat belt made of nylon and chrome leather. The over 98% energy efficiency offered was a vast increase compared with traditional belt and chain drives.

Automation and efficiency became key issues in the years of the German economic miracle. During this period, Hellmut Siegling, the son of the company's founder, developed a lightweight conveyor belt for inter-company material flow at the request of biscuit manufacturer Hermann Bahlsen. This new belt has since been marketed under the Transilon brand name. It was comparatively thin and light, but at the same time featured low-elongation, was dimensionally stable, very quiet to operate and robust and durable into the bargain. The light conveyor belt required much more compact machinery and therefore only a fraction of the space. Consequently, automation in many areas, such as parcel sorting centres or major bakeries, was possible.

Just as they did in the past, today's conveyor belts make high speeds and very small end radii possible. As a result, they enable efficient production and processing, guaranteeing efficient continual material flows and better working conditions.

Back in 1956, the company had already started to found numerous subsidiaries and affiliates abroad. Early companies to be founded were in the US, Switzerland, Mexico, Japan, Italy, France, Sweden, the Netherlands, Denmark, Australia, Austria and Spain. These were joined later by Canada, China, Malaysia, New Zealand, India, Korea, Belgium, the UK, Slovakia, Slovenia, the Czech Republic, Romania, Hungary, Ireland, Russia, Turkey, Indonesia, Brasil, Chile and Singapore.

In 1971, the world's first production machinery for three-metre wide conveyor belts was purchased. Since 1999, conveyor and processing belts, even up to a width of 4.5 metres, have been made using a calendering process.

Over time, several hundred different belt types with specific characteristics for various industries and applications have been developed. New product groups, such as plastic modular belts and plastic timing belts, gradually turned the company into a full-range supplier of belts. In 1994 the company was bought out by the Swiss corporation Forbo Holding. In 2007, Siegling Belting became Forbo Movement Systems

Products 
 Conveyor belts: Siegling Transilon, Siegling Transtex
 Flat belts: Siegling Extremultus
 Plastic modular belts: Siegling Prolink
 High efficiency timing belts: Siegling Proposition
 Tools and accessories
 Air cooled splicing tools
 Extra products

Industries & applications 
 Food industry
 Logistics/airports
 Tobacco industry
 Raw materials
 Textiles industry
 Industrial production
 Paper industry/letter sorting
 Printing industry
 Sports and leisure

Literature 
 S. Falkenberg, T. Wennekamp: Doping of conveyor belt materials with nanostructured fillers to adapt innovative performance characteristics. Proceedings of the IEEE International Conference on Automation and Logistics. Qingdao, China, 2008. –  http://ieeexplore.ieee.org/stamp/stamp.jsp?tp=&arnumber=4636396

External links 
 www.forbo-siegling.com
 Video: MICA 2012 Corporate Awards, Forbo Siegling LLC 

Manufacturing companies based in Hanover